The 2008–09 Wyoming Cowboys basketball team is currently representing the University of Wyoming in NCAA Division I men's basketball competition. It competes in the Mountain West Conference, which consists of nine universities located mostly in the Mountain States of the U.S., with outlying members in California and Texas.

Roster

Schedule

|-
!colspan=9| Exhibition

|-
!colspan=9| Regular Season

|-
!colspan=9| 2009 Mountain West Conference men's basketball tournament

|-
!colspan=9| 2009 College Basketball Invitational

References

Wyoming
Wyoming Cowboys basketball seasons
Wyoming
Wyoming Cowboys bask
Wyoming Cowboys bask